Kalavoor Ravikumar is an Indian author, screenwriter and film director who works in the Malayalam film and literature.

Early life and family 

He joined Kerala Kaumudi daily after the studies and started his professional career as a journalist. Later on he joined Kalakaumudi as Sub Editor and Program selection committee member in Jeevan TV.

He moved legally against the Mohanlal movie crew legally as per the copyright act.

Film career 
Ravikumar started his film career as a screenwriter with the movie Ottayal Pattalam in 1991. He made his Directorial debut in 2008 with Oridathoru Puzhayundu.

 Filmography 

Literary works
Novels
 Oral Jadha Hridayajalakam Nakshathrangalude Album  Dulquarum Malakhamarum 

Short Story Collections
 P. Krishnapillayude Mobile Number V.Essum Penkuttikalum Mohan Laline Enikippol Bhayankara Pediyanu Pokkuveyil ChuvappuChildren's Literature
 Abduvinte Meenukal (Novel)
 Chinese Boy (Short stories; published by Bala Sahitya Institute)

Awards and honours
 Kerala State Institute of Children's Literature's Bala Sahitya Award for Best Novel - Chinese Boy Abu Dhabi Sakthi Award for Children's Literature (2019) - Chinese Boy''

References

External links

Malayalam screenwriters
Malayalam film directors
Living people
1966 births
21st-century Indian film directors
People from Alappuzha district
Screenwriters from Kerala
Film directors from Kerala
Recipients of the Abu Dhabi Sakthi Award